The Everett Public Library (EPL) serves the residents of Everett, Washington. EPL operates a main library at 2702 Hoyt Avenue and the Evergreen branch, at 9512 Evergreen Way. The main library overlooks Puget Sound and the southern end of Whidbey Island. The library has noteworthy artworks, including works by Dudley Pratt, Ransom Patrick, Guy Anderson, Jack Gunter, and Sonja Blomdahl. The library circulates over 900,000 items per year, provides exceptional book and media collections, reference services, on-line resources, in-home library services, and programs for adults, children and families. The library's staff includes specialists in adult reference, children's books, and local history. The Everett Public Library introduced a bookmobile service in May 1924; the first of its kind in Washington state, and the second in the West. It is also one of the few public library systems in the United States that has two full-time history specialists on staff. Northwest Room co-founders Margaret Riddle and David Dilgard retired after 31 and 40 years respectively, and their positions are currently filled by Lisa Labovitch with the second role waiting to be posted.

History 
 

The town of Everett was incorporated in 1893, but its initial growth was quickly halted by the financial crisis that year. The Everett Public Library was created on June 10, 1894 by the Everett Woman's Book Club. On that day a group of local women met in the home of Mary Lincoln Brown to form the Book Club that would have as its aim the "improvement of the mind through the study of literature", but more specifically, the establishment of a public library. Interest in forming a library partly came about due to the lack of reading material for patients at Everett General Hospital, which was noticed by some of the club's members that were involved with the hospital's establishment.

The initial collection of 1,000 books was donated by members of women's clubs across the country. Gathering books and petitioning City Council when funds were scarce, the Everett Woman's Book Club set up a temporary library in the home of a member, with the city offering them three rooms in City Hall in 1898; service began on April 21 of that year. The Club continued to work for permanent quarters, next moving to a small building, and in 1905 the Everett Public Library became a Carnegie library after it received a $25,000 Carnegie grant to design an official library for the city of Everett.

Everett started the first bookmobile service in Washington state, and the second in the West in 1924. Nicknamed Pegasus, the Model T Ford remained in service until 1950. In 1992 the library re-acquired the vehicle, and began restoring it to as close to its original condition as possible. Pegasus briefly participated in Fourth of July parades and other community events, and was able to lay claim to being the world's oldest extant bookmobile; it currently resides in City storage. Bookmobile services continued utilizing a range of different vehicles until 2014, when the library had to eliminate its outreach department due to budget cuts.

By 1930 Everett had outgrown the Carnegie building, but with the Great Depression there was little hope of a new building. Industrialist Leonard Howarth left a bequest to the city which was used to erect a new $100,000 library at 2702 Hoyt Avenue. Seattle architect Carl F. Gould designed the facility, which opened October 3, 1934.

In 1962, the library expanded, doubling its shelving capacity. In 1981 an anonymous donor gave the library $75,000 to computerize its circulation, cataloging, and inventory systems. In 1985, the Evergreen Branch is opened, and in 1987 funding was approved to add an additional  to the Main Library.

In 1991 expansion of the Main Library was completed. This expansion was designed by the Cardwell/Thomas Architects and B. Craig Thompson of Dykeman Architects. The expansion won an award from the American Institute of Architects.

On November 28, 2018, Everett City Council approved funding for the expansion of the Evergreen Branch. Operations ceased at the branch location on December 24, 2018, and the renovated library reopened on December 6, 2019.

The original Carnegie building, located at 3001 Oakes, still stands but no longer houses the library. Over the years, it has been used as a funeral parlor, housed Snohomish County executive offices, and other County functions; it is currently the home of the Carnegie Resource Center for social services. The 1905 building is listed on the National Register of Historic Places.

Collections

Digital collections 
Digital collections include:

Everett Herald  -  131 images drawn from the 1950s and 1960s Everett Herald archives.
Everett High School Nesika Collection - searchable annuals from Everett High School for the years 1909 through 2013. Note that there are no annuals for 1917-1918 due to a cessation of publication during World War I.
Everett Massacre  -  215 images including photographs, art work, oral histories and movies.
Frank LaRoche - 37 views of the initial Everett townsite, taken from 1891-1892.
J.A. Juleen Studio - 397 images taken by commercial photographers John and Lee Juleen, and Everett Murray, from 1908-1954.
John Patric - unpublished manuscripts, art, and newsletters from the collection of John Patric - an author and eccentric who called the City of Snohomish home.
King and Baskerville - 114 images taken in and around Everett in early 1892.
Kirk's Studio - 50 images taken in the Everett and Monte Cristo areas from 1898-1901.
Neil House - 752 images captured by City of Everett photographer, Neil House, from 1975-1978.
Oral Histories - a series of interviews conducted in 1974 with long-time Everett residents.
Sanborn Insurance Maps - high-resolution scans of 1914 and 1955 Sanborn fire insurance maps, mostly covering the North Everett peninsula.
Snohomish County Elections Committee - 83 files on local politicians active in Snohomish County from 1999-2003, evaluating each on their attitudes towards the LGBTQ community.
Sumner Iron Works - 120 images scanned from 5"x7" glass plate negatives from the Sumner Iron Works product catalogs of the early 20th century.

Directors 
Alice McFarland (later Alice Duryee), 1898–1900
Gretchen Hathaway, 1900–1907
Jessie B. Judd, Interim Librarian, 1907
Adelaide E. Wharton, 1907–1914
Mary Frank, 1914–1916 (reportedly the first trained librarian to hold the position)
Elizabeth Topping, 1916–1919
Mabel Ashley, 1919–1946
Fred M. Stephen, 1946–1949
Phil Blodgett, 1949–1973
Gary Strong, 1973–1976
Victoire Grassl, Interim director, 1976–1977
Mark Nesse, 1977–2007
Eileen Simmons, (a Library Journal 2007 Mover & Shaker) 2007–2017
Abigail Cooley, 2017–present

References

External links 

Everett Public Library's web site
Everett Public Library history
Publications by the library, WorldCat

Public libraries in Washington (state)
Library buildings completed in 1905
Carnegie libraries in Washington (state)
Education in Everett, Washington
Education in Whatcom County, Washington
Buildings and structures in Everett, Washington
Tourist attractions in Everett, Washington
1905 establishments in Washington (state)